Emma Kanerva (born 13 July 1985) is a Finnish dressage rider. She represented Finland in the 2012 Summer Olympics in London, finishing 22nd. She also competed at the World Equestrian Games in 2010 and 2018. Kanerva represented Finland three times during the European Championships in 2011, 2013, 2015 and 2021.

References

Living people
1985 births
People from Mikkeli
Finnish female equestrians
Olympic equestrians of Finland
Equestrians at the 2012 Summer Olympics
Finnish dressage riders
Finnish expatriate sportspeople in Germany
Sportspeople from South Savo